Thirty athletes (25 men and 5 women) from Ukraine competed at the 1996 Summer Paralympics in Atlanta, United States.

Medallists

See also
Ukraine at the Paralympics
Ukraine at the 1996 Summer Olympics

References 

Nations at the 1996 Summer Paralympics
1996
Summer Paralympics